Etonbreen is a glacier on Nordaustlandet, Svalbard. The glacier debouches into Wahlenbergfjorden. It is named after Eton College.

References

Glaciers of Nordaustlandet